Noah Kalina (born July 4, 1980) is an American art photographer. Much of Kalina's work focuses on the passage of time including his well-known project Everyday which shows the aging of a human. His photographs have appeared in The New York Times Magazine, Monocle, Businessweek, Nylon, Esquire, Le Monde, and Interview, among others.

Life
Born in Huntington, New York, on July 4, 1980, Kalina attended Harborfields High School. He graduated from the School of Visual Arts. For years he was based in Williamsburg, Brooklyn but Kalina now works from a studio in Lumberland, New York. Kalina has created a number of widely exhibited photographs, generally working in medium format, using the Danish Phase One XF camera+IQ3 back with Schneider and Phase One lenses and Profoto strobes.

Time-based works
A number of Kalina's projects have been noted as examinations of the passage of time. By returning to a subject at a later point and creating additional photographs of it, a sequence of his images draws attention both to the aspects of the subject that have changed and the aspects that have remained the same. Projects that use this format include Everyday (himself, since 2000), Domino Sugar (the Domino Sugar Factory, since 2010), River and N1 (the intersection of River Street and North 1st Street in Brooklyn, since 2013), Lumberland (a black walnut tree, since 2015), and The River (the Delaware River, since 2015). In 2020, The New York Times commissioned a new extended series of photos-over-time from Kalina of the view from his bedroom window from October 2020 to June 2021.

Everyday

Kalina began taking a photo of himself every day starting on January 11, 2000, at age 19. The video Everyday shows the photos chronologically, six per second, with an original piano score by his former girlfriend Carly Comando. Kalina uploaded the video in August 2006 where it received widespread attention and has since become the subject of homages and parodies. The long-term project is ongoing. Since 2009, Kalina has been using the Nikon Coolpix S10 to make his daily portrait.

Other notable photographs
Kalina's style of photography has been described as "meditative" and "quiet".
 In May 2012, Kalina created the official wedding portrait of Mark Zuckerberg and Priscilla Chan in their backyard in Palo Alto, California.
 In 2012, Disney selected Kalina to produce a series of photographs of their characters in their parks called "The Looking Glass".
 In 2013, conglomerate General Electric commissioned Kalina to produce photographs in their newly opened $50 million jet engine testing site to document aviation developments.
 In 2016, tech-giant Google sent Kalina to document through photography their data centers around the world.
 In 2019, after major renovations, the Museum of Modern Art commissioned a series of photographs to highlight their reopening campaign "the New MoMA".

Additional projects
In July 2019, Kalina began to publish a popular email newsletter covering topics including photography and nature and Kalina has commented this project is his primary focus. In October 2020, Kalina and commercial director Adam Lisagor launched the podcast All Consuming where they review direct-to-consumer brands that advertise on Instagram.

Exhibitions

Bibliography

References

External links

 
 Noah Kalina at Aperture Foundation
 Noah Kalina at MutualArt

American portrait photographers
20th-century American photographers
21st-century American photographers
People from Huntington, New York
Photographers from New York City
School of Visual Arts alumni
1980 births
Living people